Martin Rainer (born 27 February 1977) is an Austrian footballer currently playing as a midfielder for SV Götzens.

Career statistics

Club

Notes

References

External links
 Martin Rainer at the HKFA
 Yau Yee League profile

1977 births
Living people
Austrian footballers
Association football defenders
Hong Kong FC players
Austrian Regionalliga players
Hong Kong Premier League players
Hong Kong First Division League players
Austrian expatriate footballers
Austrian expatriate sportspeople in Hong Kong
Expatriate footballers in Hong Kong